The first season of the Russian reality talent show The Voice Kids premiered on February 28, 2014 on Channel One. Dima Bilan, Pelageya, and Maxim Fadeev became the first coaches. Dmitry Nagiev and Natalia Vodianova appeared as the show's presenter. Alisa Kozhikina was announced the winner on April 25, 2014, marking Maxim Fadeev's first win as a coach.

Coaches and presenters

Dima Bilan, Pelageya, and Maxim Fadeev become coaches of season one.

Dmitry Nagiev and Natalia Vodianova become presenters of season one.

Teams
 Colour key

Blind auditions
Colour key

Episode 1 (February 28)

Episode 2 (March 8)

Episode 3 (March 14)

Episode 4 (March 21)

Episode 5 (March 28)

The Battles
The Battles round started with the first half of episode 6 and ended with the first half of episode 8 (broadcast on April 4, 11, 18, 2014). 
Contestants who win their battle will advance to the Playoff rounds.
Colour key

The Sing-offs
The Sing-offs round started with the second half of episode 6 and ended with the second half of episode 8 (broadcast on April 4, 11, 18, 2014). 
Contestants who was saved by their coaches will advance to the Final.
Colour key

Live shows
Colour key:

Week 1: Final (April 25)

Reception

Ratings

References

Polina Bogusevich won the Junior Eurovision Song Contest 2017

External links

1
2014 Russian television seasons